House at 226 West Penn Street, also known as Long Beach Historical Museum, is a historic home located at Long Beach in Nassau County, New York. It was built in 1909 and is a two-story, American Craftsman / bungalow style residence with a stucco exterior and a clay tile hipped roof.  It features a large stucco colonnaded wraparound porch supported by eight thick columns.  Also on the property is a contributing early 20th century garage.  It has housed the Long Beach Historical Museum since 1997.

It was listed on the National Register of Historic Places in 2008.

References

External links
Long Beach Historical & Preservation Society website

History museums in New York (state)
Houses on the National Register of Historic Places in New York (state)
Houses completed in 1909
Museums in Nassau County, New York
Houses in Nassau County, New York
Bungalow architecture in New York (state)
American Craftsman architecture in New York (state)
Long Beach, New York
National Register of Historic Places in Hempstead (town), New York